The 2010 OFC Futsal Championship was the seventh edition of the main international futsal tournament of the Oceanian region. It took place from August 8 to August 14, 2010, and was hosted by Fiji, which had also hosted the two previous editions.

The number of participating nations rose to seven, up from four in 2009, as New Zealand, Tuvalu and French Polynesia (under the name "Tahiti") returned to the competition. Those three nations had previously participated in 2008. Vanuatu, New Caledonia, defending champion Solomon Islands, and hosts Fiji, all returned from 2009.

The 2010 championship was played on a round robin league system. In 2009, the championship had been played with a knock out group stage followed by a final. Consequently, there were twenty-one matches played in 2010, compared to just eight in 2009.

Prior to the competition, the Solomon Star reported that Fiji and New Zealand were expected to be the main threats to Solomon Islands' attempt to win its third consecutive title.

The Championship was won by Solomon Islands, for the third consecutive time. The country achieved a perfect record of six wins in six games (rounding them off with a 21-2 victory over Tuvalu on the final day), totalling eighteen points. Fiji came second, with four wins (and thus twelve points), and a positive goal differential of 8. New Zealand was third, also with four wins, and a positive goal differential of 4. Solomon Islands' team, the Kurukuru, reportedly received "a hero’s welcome" upon their return to Honiara.

Championship 
The seven teams played one another in a round robin league system over the span of the championship.

August 8

August 9

August 10

August 11

August 12

August 13

August 14

References

OFC Futsal Championship
Oceanian Futsal Championship, 2010
Futsal
2009